Hans Jörg (born 4 November 1950) is a retired German football player. He spent one season in the Bundesliga with FC Bayern Munich.

Honours
 Bundesliga champion: 1972–73

References

External links
 

1950 births
Living people
German footballers
FC Bayern Munich footballers
FC Augsburg players
Bundesliga players
2. Bundesliga players
Association football forwards
20th-century German people